Clarence Lee (28 December 1890 – 5 February 1959) was an Australian cricketer. He played one first-class match for Tasmania in 1925/26.

See also
 List of Tasmanian representative cricketers

References

External links
 

1890 births
1959 deaths
Australian cricketers
Tasmania cricketers
Cricketers from Tasmania